Robert Warren Brimmer (May 8, 1935 – August 6, 2018), known professionally as Robert Dix, was an American film actor. He appeared in 50 films between 1954 and 1974.

Biographic data 

Dix was born in Los Angeles, California, the son of actor Richard Dix. As a teenager, he left home after his mother remarried.

Dix initially was billed as Bob Brimmer, using his legal name. For a year, he worked with the National Academy of Theater Arts in New York City. Following that experience, he gained a two-year contract with Metro-Goldwyn-Mayer. He later appeared in Forbidden Planet (1956), Forty Guns (1957), and other films including a lead role in Maury Dexter's Air Patrol. In the 1960's he appeared in a string of b-movies by Al Adamson including Hell's Bloody Devils, Satan's Sadists, Blood of Dracula's Castle, and Five Bloody Graves. His last role was a doomed agent in Roger Moore's first James Bond Feature, Live And Let Die, being killed before the opening credits during a marching New Orleans funeral that turns out to be his own. 

On May 31, 1956, Dix married actress Janet Lake in Las Vegas. They divorced in 1959. Later he was married to Anna May Slaughter, a nightclub singer, and Darlene Lucht. Dix owned a home near Demuth Park in Palm Springs, California. He died of respiratory failure at a hospital in Tucson, Arizona, at age 83. He was buried at the Russellville–Dragoon Cemetery in Cochise County, Arizona.

Television appearances

In 1961, Dix played the part of Jamie, a lieutenant in the US Cavalry on the television program Gunsmoke and later that same year as “Spotted Wolf”, a love torn Indian hunted by the Cavalry in the S7E10 “Indian Ford”.

Filmography

References

External links
 

1935 births
2018 deaths
20th-century American male actors
Deaths from respiratory failure
Actors from Palm Springs, California